Lamprima insularis, the Lord Howe stag beetle, is a species of beetle in the family Lucanidae, that is endemic to Lord Howe Island.The insects have small mandibles in both sexes and a metallic green body.

References

External links 
 Lamprima insularis live photos
 Photos and information on L. insularis

Beetles described in 1885
Lampriminae
Beetles of Oceania
Insects of Lord Howe Island